Piggy, piggie or piggies may refer to:

As a nickname
Denis D'Amour (1959–2005), guitarist for the Canadian heavy metal band Voivod
Fan Chun Yip (born 1976), Hong Kong retired football goalkeeper
Piggy French (born 1980), British equestrienne
Ward Lambert (1888–1958), American college men's basketball coach
Robert Muldoon (1921–1992), 31st Prime Minister of New Zealand
David Powell (rugby union) (born 1942), former England international rugby union player
Edwin Simandl, owner of the Orange Tornadoes and Newark Tornadoes of the National Football League
Piggy Ward (1867–1912), American professional baseball player
Roscoe Word (American football guard) (1882–1942), American college football player and coach
Mark Riddell (born 1980), Australian former Rugby League Player, commentator.
Celina Chung (born 2005), Girlfriend of Harvey.

Slang
Domestic pig
Guinea pig
Toe

Fictional characters
 Miss Piggy, a Muppets character
 Piggy (Merrie Melodies), from the Merrie Melodies cartoons
 Piggy (Power Rangers), from Power Rangers: S.P.D.
 Piggy Malone, in the BBC television series The Two Ronnies
 Piggy the Penguin, in the animated series Eek! The Cat
 Piggy, a major character in the novel Lord of the Flies
 Piggy, in the 2003 novel Gone to the Dogs
 "Piggies", slang term for Pequeninos, an alien species in the Ender's Game series by Orson Scott Card
 Zhu Bajie, from the novel Journey to the West
  Sir Francis "Piggy" Beekman, in the 1953 movie Gentlemen Prefer Blondes

Entertainment
 Piggy D., stage name of guitarist Matt Montgomery (born 1975)
 "Piggies", a song written by George Harrison on the Beatles' White Album
 "Piggy" (song), by Nine Inch Nails from their album The Downward Spiral
 Piggy (Roblox game), a Roblox game made by MiniToon
 Piggy (film), a 2022 Spanish horror film

Other uses
 Tip-cat, an outdoor game also called a piggy
 "This Little Piggy" or "This Little Pig" nursery rhyme

See also
 
 
 Piggybacking (disambiguation)
 Piglet (disambiguation)
 Pigi (disambiguation)

Lists of people by nickname